The Regional Natural Park of Corsica is a natural park. It was listed in 1972 and then relisted for 10 years in June 1999. The Natural Park covers nearly 40% of the island of Corsica. A section the park centering on the Gulf of Porto was listed as a UNESCO World Heritage Site in 1983 because of its beauty, excellent representation of Corsican shrubland, and avian and marine diversity. 

The aim of the natural park is to protect the rich flora and wildlife of the island. 145 communes are part of the program which supports the project and are grouped in 11 micro-regions, called:

 Falasorma Marsulinu 
 Caccia Ghjunsani 
 Niolu 
 Castagniccia 
 Centru di Corsica 
 Fium'Orbu 
 Alta Rocca 
 Taravu Bastelica 
 Gravona 
 Cruzinu Dui Sorru
 Deux Sevi

References

1972 establishments in France
Geography of Corsica
Protected areas established in 1972
Corse
Tourist attractions in Corsica
Biosphere reserves of France